Henry Sloane Cooper (September 12, 1888 – 1970) was an Ontario embroidery manufacturer and political figure. He represented Toronto Northwest in the Legislative Assembly of Ontario from October 20, 1919 to May 10, 1923 as a Liberal member.

Biography
He was born in the village of Davisville, Ontario, the son of Hugh Cooper and Eliza Sloane, and educated in Toronto and at the Ontario Agricultural College in Guelph.

Cooper served as an officer, rising to Captain, in the 3rd Battalion (Toronto Regiment), CEF during World War I.  He enlisted at CFB Valcartier on 23 September 1914, and received a Military Cross and Bar during his service.

References

External links 
Trench Warfare, Oral Histories of the First World War

1888 births
1970 deaths
Ontario Liberal Party MPPs
Recipients of the Military Cross